Shilin is a Russian masculine surname, its feminine counterpart is Shilina. Notable people with the surname include:

Afanasy Shilin (1924–1982), Soviet artillery officer
Aleksandr Shilin (born 1976), Kyrgyz swimmer
Andrey Shilin (born 1974), Uzbekistani sprint canoer

Russian-language surnames